Fanya Anisimovna Baron (1887–1921) was a Lithuanian Jewish anarchist revolutionary. She spent her early life participating in the Chicago workers' movement, but following the 1917 Revolution, she moved to Ukraine and participated in the Makhnovist movement. For her anarchist activities, she was arrested and executed by the Cheka.

Biography
Born Freida Nisanovna Greck in 1887, at a young age, Fanya and her family moved to the United States, where they took the name "Grefenson". In Chicago, she began a relationship with the exiled Russian anarchist Aron Baron, with whom she participated in the local workers' movement led by the Industrial Workers of the World (IWW). During a workers' demonstration on 17 January 1915, Fanya was physically attacked by police and arrested, but was bailed out by the American activist Jane Addams.

With the outbreak of the February Revolution, Aron and Fanya Baron returned from exile and moved to Kyiv, in Ukraine, where they participated in the local workers' movement. In the wake of the October Revolution, the couple then moved to Kharkiv, where they participated in the establishment of the Nabat, a confederation of Ukrainian anarchists. The Nabat went on to join the Makhnovshchina and officially backed Nestor Makhno's Revolutionary Insurgent Army of Ukraine.

Following the defeat of the White movement at the siege of Perekop in November 1920, the Bolsheviks turned on their anarchist allies, launching a surprise attack against them on several fronts. In Kharkiv, members of the Nabat, including Aron and Fanya Baron, were arrested en-masse and transferred to Taganka Prison in Moscow. 

During the founding congress of the Profintern in July 1921, the anarchists imprisoned at Taganka staged a hunger strike, in an attempt to attract the attention of the foreign syndicalist delegates. Despite formal protests made to the Bolshevik leadership, the accusations of political repression were repeatedly denied by the authorities. Soon after, Fanya managed to escape prison and sought refuge with her brother-in-law Semion Baron, a member of the Communist Party. She confided in Semion that she planned to help her husband escape from prison, but before she could carry this out, she was arrested by the Cheka. 

On 30 September 1921, Fanya Baron was executed by the Cheka. Emma Goldman attempted to protest the execution, but was dissuaded by her friends and eventually left the country, thoroughly disillusioned with the Russian Revolution. After 18 years in prison, Aron Baron himself disappeared during the Great Purge of 1938.

See also

Peter Arshinov
Alexander Berkman
Emma Goldman
Nestor Makhno
Okhrana
Russian Revolution of 1917
Russian Civil War

References

Bibliography

Further reading

External links
The Fanya Baron Library  at Jura Books

1887 births
1921 deaths
20th-century Lithuanian Jews
20th-century Lithuanian women politicians
Executed anarchists
Industrial Workers of the World members
Jewish anarchists
Jewish Lithuanian politicians
Jews executed by the Soviet Union
Lithuanian activists
Lithuanian anarchists
Lithuanian emigrants to Ukraine
Lithuanian emigrants to the United States
Lithuanian Jews
Lithuanian people executed by the Soviet Union
Makhnovshchina
People executed by the Soviet Union by firearm
People from Vilensky Uyezd
People of the Russian Revolution
Politicians from Vilnius